Enzo Polidori (21 November 1936 – 3 July 2021) was an Italian politician. A member of the Italian Communist Party, he served as Mayor of Piombino from 1976 to 1983. In 1983, he received 30,584 votes and was elected to the Chamber of Deputies. He was re-elected in 1987 with 22,557 votes.

References

1936 births
2021 deaths
Italian politicians
Deputies of Legislature IX of Italy
Deputies of Legislature X of Italy
Mayors of places in Tuscany
Italian Communist Party politicians
Democratic Party of the Left politicians
Democrats of the Left politicians
Democratic Party (Italy) politicians
People from Piombino